Franklin County (county code FR) is a county located in the eastern portion of the U.S. state of Kansas. As of the 2020 census, the county population was 25,996. Its county seat and most populous city is Ottawa. The county is predominantly rural. Formerly it was a part of the Kansas City metropolitan area, but was removed in 2013. However, it is still part of the Kansas City-Overland Park-Kansas City MO-KS CSA.

History

Early history

For many millennia, the Great Plains of North America was inhabited by nomadic Native Americans.  From the 16th century to 18th century, the Kingdom of France claimed ownership of large parts of North America.  In 1762, after the French and Indian War, France secretly ceded New France to Spain, per the Treaty of Fontainebleau.

19th century
In 1802, Spain returned most of the land to France, but keeping title to about 7,500 square miles.  In 1803, most of the land for modern day Kansas was acquired by the United States from France as part of the 828,000 square mile Louisiana Purchase for 2.83 cents per acre.

The area was included in a treaty ceding land to the Osage Nation in 1808, and ceded back to the federal government in 1825.  After 1825 and prior to 1867, treaties with various Indian nations set off parts of what was later to become Franklin County for the use of Indian tribes removed from their ancestral lands. These tribes included:  Ottawa, Chippewa,  Sac and Fox,  Peoria, and Potawatomi. 

In 1854, the Kansas Territory was organized under the provisions of the Kansas-Nebraska Act.  In 1855, Franklin County was established as one of the 33 original Kansas Territory counties created by the first Territorial Legislature of 1855. The county was named after Benjamin Franklin. In 1861, Kansas became the 34th U.S. state.

Geography

Major highways
 Interstate 35
 U.S. Route 50
 U.S. Route 59
 K-33
 K-68

Adjacent counties
 Douglas County (north)
 Johnson County (northeast)
 Miami County (east)
 Linn County (southeast)
 Anderson County (south)
 Coffey County (southwest)
 Osage County (west)

Demographics

Franklin County comprises the Ottawa, KS Micropolitan Statistical Area, which is included in the Kansas City-Overland Park-Kansas City, MO-KS Combined Statistical Area.

As of the U.S. Census in 2000, there were 24,784 people, 9,452 households, and 6,720 families residing in the county.  The population density was 43 people per square mile (17/km2).  There were 10,229 housing units at an average density of 18 per square mile (7/km2).  The racial makeup of the county was 95.05% White, 1.21% Black or African American, 0.94% Native American, 0.31% Asian, 0.78% from other races, and 1.71% from two or more races. Hispanic or Latino of any race were 2.62% of the population.

There were 9,452 households, out of which 34.70% had children under the age of 18 living with them, 58.10% were married couples living together, 8.90% had a female householder with no husband present, and 28.90% were non-families. 24.80% of all households were made up of individuals, and 11.30% had someone living alone who was 65 years of age or older.  The average household size was 2.56 and the average family size was 3.04.

In the county, the population was spread out, with 27.50% under the age of 18, 8.90% from 18 to 24, 28.30% from 25 to 44, 21.20% from 45 to 64, and 14.00% who were 65 years of age or older.  The median age was 36 years. For every 100 females there were 98.30 males.  For every 100 females age 18 and over, there were 94.10 males.

The median income for a household in the county was $39,052, and the median income for a family was $45,197. Males had a median income of $31,223 versus $22,992 for females. The per capita income for the county was $17,311.  About 5.60% of families and 7.70% of the population were below the poverty line, including 8.40% of those under age 18 and 7.30% of those age 65 or over.

Government

Presidential elections
Franklin County is often carried by Republican Candidates. The last time a Democratic candidate has carried Franklin County was in 1964 by Lyndon B. Johnson.

Laws
Following amendment to the Kansas Constitution in 1986, the county remained a prohibition, or "dry", county until 1994, when voters approved the sale of alcoholic liquor by the individual drink with a 30 percent food sales requirement.

The county voted "No" on the 2022 Kansas Value Them Both Amendment, an anti-abortion ballot measure, by 56% to 44% despite backing Donald Trump with 68% of the vote to Joe Biden's 30% in the 2020 presidential election.

Education

Unified school districts
 West Franklin USD 287
 Central Heights USD 288
 Wellsville USD 289
 Ottawa USD 290

Colleges and universities
 Ottawa University, Ottawa
 Neosho County Community College (branch campus), Ottawa

Communities

Cities

 Lane
 Ottawa (county seat) 
 Pomona
 Princeton
 Rantoul
 Richmond
 Wellsville
 Williamsburg

Unincorporated places

 Centropolis
 Homewood
 Imes
 LeLoup
 Peoria
 Ransomville
 Richter

Ghost towns
 Minneola
 Norwood
 Silkville

Townships
Franklin County is divided into sixteen townships.  The city of Ottawa is considered governmentally independent and is excluded from the census figures for the townships.  In the following table, the population center is the largest city (or cities) included in that township's population total, if it is of a significant size.

Notable people

Steve Grogan, NFL quarterback, who grew up in Ottawa.
Chely Wright, Singer
James Still (playwright), writer, who grew up in Pomona
Gary Hart, Democratic US Senator

See also
 National Register of Historic Places listings in Franklin County, Kansas

References

Notes

Further reading

 Standard Atlas of Franklin County, Kansas; Geo. A. Ogle & Co; 69 pages; 1920.
 Plat Book of Franklin County, Kansas; North West Publishing Co; 36 pages; 1903.

External links

County
 
 Franklin County – Directory of Public Officials
Historical
 Franklin County Genealogical Society
Maps
 Franklin County Maps: Current, Historic, KDOT
 Kansas Highway Maps: Current, Historic, KDOT
 Kansas Railroad Maps: Current, 1996, 1915, KDOT and Kansas Historical Society

 
Kansas counties
1855 establishments in Kansas Territory